Stulang Laut Ferry Terminal (also known as Berjaya Waterfront Ferry Terminal), is a ferry terminal located in Stulang in Johor Bahru. It was renamed Berjaya Waterfront Ferry Terminal in 2013 when Berjaya Group bought over the property. However, local media still refers to it as Stulang Laut Ferry Terminal as of 2019.

References

Buildings and structures in Johor Bahru
Transport in Johor Bahru
Water transport in Malaysia